The Memorial Unit (DA), known as the Darrington Unit until 2021, is a Texas Department of Criminal Justice (TDCJ) men's prison located in Brazoria County, Texas, with a Rosharon, Texas postal address; it is not inside the Rosharon census-designated place. Most of the unit is in an unincorporated area, while a portion is in the city limits of Sandy Point.

The prison has the Region III Administrative Office of the Windham School District.

History
The prison opened in 1917. It sits on land that was owned by the Mexican government until 1824. In the 1830s and 1840s, the land housed a plantation owned by John Darrington of Alabama. Slaves picked cotton and sugar cane there. Darrington did not live on the site, but the name Darrington Plantation stuck even after subsequent owners bought the land. The state of Texas kept the name of the plantation when they opened the prison, designating it the Darrington Unit.   

The song "Wasn't That a Mighty Storm" was first recorded by John A. Lomax in 1934 at Darrington, sung by "Sin-Killer" Griffin who claimed authorship. In 1935 Darrington housed African American prisoners.

In 1963, before racial desegregation occurred, the facility housed white second offenders. In the late 1980s, Darrington housed a lot of leaders of prison gangs.

In 2017 a judge ordered the installation of air conditioning.

In January 2021, State Representative James White, chair of the Texas House Committee on Corrections, asked the Texas Board of Criminal Justice to rename the Darrington Unit and two other Texas prisons because the names were associated with slavery or convict leasing. White referred to John Darrington as a "plantation mega owner". Later in the year, TDCJ changed the name of the prison to the Memorial Unit in honor of the agency's deceased employees.

Operations
The Texas Legislature designated portions of Angleton ISD that by September 1, 1995 had not been annexed by Alvin Community College as in the Brazosport College zone. As Darrington Unit is not in the maps of Alvin CC, it is in the Brazosport College zone. There was a section of H.B. No. 2744, filed on March 6, 2007, which would have changed the boundary between Alvin CC and Brazosport CC to put the Darrington Unit in the Alvin CC service boundary.

Notable prisoners
 David Graham, perpetrator of the murder of Adrianne Jones
 Dennis Hope, whose breakout is dramatized in Season 1, Episode 3 of the National Geographic TV docudrama series, Breakout.

References

External links

 Darrington Unit." Texas Department of Criminal Justice.
 Collier, Keith. "Southwestern holds convocation inside maximum security prison." Southwestern Baptist Theological Seminary. September 2, 2011.

Prisons in Brazoria County, Texas
1917 establishments in Texas
Buildings and structures in Brazoria County, Texas